Mustilia semiravida is a moth in the Endromidae family. It was described by Yang in 1995. It is found in China (Guangxi).

The wingspan is about 52 mm. The forewings are grey from the inner half to the postmedial line and with a black spot at the end of the cell. The outer half from the postmedial line to the outer margin is red brown and with brownish-yellow veins. The hindwings are brownish-yellow, with the inner half red-brown.

References

Moths described in 1995
Mustilia